Michael Friisdahl (born in Roskilde, Denmark) is the president and chief executive officer of Maple Leaf Sports & Entertainment, a sports and entertainment company.  Friisdahl was appointed in October 2015, and is responsible for overseeing MLSE's sports properties which includes ownership of the Toronto Maple Leafs (National Hockey League), Toronto Raptors (National Basketball Association), Toronto FC (Major League Soccer), Toronto Argonauts (Canadian Football League), Toronto Marlies (American Hockey League), Raptors 905 (NBA G League) and Toronto FC II (United Soccer League).  It also owns and operates Scotiabank Arena, a multi-purpose indoor sporting arena in Toronto that has hosted more than 36 million fans over 2,500 events since its opening in 1999, and has invested in five other Toronto's sports facilities — Coca-Cola Coliseum, home of the Marlies; BMO Field, home of Toronto FC; Lamport Stadium; the Ford Performance Centre, the practice facility for the Maple Leafs and Marlies and the OVO Athletic Centre, the practice facility of the Raptors. MLSE operates and manages events at Coca-Cola Coliseum, BMO Field and OVO Athletic Centre.

Prior to joining MLSE, Friisdahl served as president and chief executive officer of Air Canada's Leisure Group since it was formed in 2012, combining Air Canada Vacations tour operations with Air Canada Rouge, a vacation and leisure airline subsidiary of Air Canada. With Friisdahl at the helm, Air Canada rouge saw significant growth and was an important contributor to Air Canada's very successful transformation.  Following the launch of Air Canada rouge with just 4 aircraft serving 13 destinations, the airline grew to include a total of 34 planes and offers competitively priced travel to more than 75 routes in Europe, Mexico, the U.S., the Caribbean, Asia, South America and Canada.  Air Canada rouge, through a partnership with the Disney Institute, built a unique culture focused on customer engagement, along with applying next-generation communications technology to create an engaging and customer friendly experience. Air Canada rouge was one of the first airlines in North America to offer streaming inflight entertainment to its customers’ own devices.

References

Danish businesspeople
Danish expatriates in Canada
Major League Soccer executives
Maple Leaf Sports & Entertainment
People from Roskilde
Toronto Maple Leafs executives
Toronto Raptors executives
Living people
Year of birth missing (living people)